The West End Central Police Station was a police station at 27 Savile Row, in London's West End, on the junction with Boyle Street. It was the headquarters of the 'C' division of the Metropolitan Police, station-code 'CD' (the letter D depicting it to be a divisional headquarters) covering the City of Westminster. 
It was opened in 1940 and was also the station where officers were dispatched from to shut down The Beatles' rooftop concert on January 30, 1969, following noise complaints. The front desk was closed in 2017.  It was subsequently sold to a private developer for a reported £50m.

References

Police stations in the City of Westminster
Buildings and structures in Mayfair
Government buildings completed in 1940
Modernist architecture in London
Former Metropolitan Police stations